Nigel Davies (born 1960) is a Welsh chess Grandmaster, chess coach and writer.

Davies won the British (Under-21) Boys Championship in 1979 and the British Rapidplay Chess Championship in 1987.

In July 2015 Davies transferred his FIDE registration from England to Wales and will become eligible to represent them internationally.

Davies is also a keen practitioner of Tai Chi and Qigong, and is a registered instructor with the Tai Chi Union for Great Britain.

Books

References

External links
 Nigel Davies' own website  TigerChess
 Nigel Davies' blog  Chess Improver
 
 Interview with GM Nigel Davies

1960 births
Living people
Chess grandmasters
English chess players
British chess writers
English non-fiction writers
Chess coaches
English male non-fiction writers